= Singeyer Pass =

Mountain pass in Nunavut, Canada

- Location within Nunavut

Third Approach
- Location: Nunavut, Canada
- Coordinates: 62°55′01″N 064°49′50″W
- Topo map: NTS 25I15 Williams Peninsula

Singeyer Pass is a mountain pass on southern Baffin Island, Nunavut, Canada.
